Bracebridge Heath Cricket Club play in the village of Bracebridge Heath on the outskirts of Lincoln, Lincolnshire, England.  The club won the 2002 England and Wales Cricket Board (ECB) Notts Premier League and won the ECB Lincolnshire Premier League every year from 2003 to 2009.

References

External links

 

English club cricket teams
Cricket in Lincolnshire